James Cornelius Shevlin (July 9, 1909 – October 30, 1974) was a first baseman in Major League Baseball. He played for the Detroit Tigers and Cincinnati Reds.
Raised in Cincinnati by a father who was a politically active boxing promoter and restaurateur, Jimmy was considered one of the best college players in the East while at the College of the Holy Cross.

References

External links

1909 births
1974 deaths
Major League Baseball first basemen
Detroit Tigers players
Cincinnati Reds players
Baseball players from Cincinnati